The Fire Station No. 2 in Topeka, Kansas, at 719-723 Van Buren, is a fire station which was built in 1927.  It was listed on the National Register of Historic Places in 2002 as Fire Station No. 2-Topeka.

It was designed by architect Thomas Wilson Williamson in 1927 to serve as Topeka's Fire Department Headquarters and as fire station for Company No. 2. 
It is a two-and-a-half-story building with elements of Mediterranean Revival style (within broader Spanish Colonial Revival style) including its wrought iron balcony railings and its Spanish tile roof.

It was remodeled in 1979 to serve as the Topeka Emergency Communication Center (TECOM), Topeka's then-new combined fire and police dispatch and 911
center.

References

Fire stations on the National Register of Historic Places in Kansas
National Register of Historic Places in Shawnee County, Kansas
Mediterranean Revival architecture
Fire stations completed in 1927
1927 establishments in Kansas
National Register of Historic Places in Topeka, Kansas